Gas House Kids Go West is a 1947 American comedy film directed by William Beaudine. A sequel to the 1946 film Gas House Kids, which had starred former Dead End Kids leader Billy Halop, this new film emphasized comedy and recast the gang with Our Gang alumni Carl "Alfalfa" Switzer and Tommy Bond, East Side Kids alumnus Benny Bartlett, and juvenile actors Rudy Wissler and Ray Dolciame.

Plot
The Gas House Kids of New York travel west to California after winning a basketball competition. The boys cash in their train tickets and decide to buy a used car instead, donating the money saved to charity. At a used-car lot, the shady dealer gives them a stolen car, too hot for New York, to drive cross-country to his contact in California. After depositing the car, the boys stay at a ranch manned by a gang of crooks.

Soundtrack
Alfalfa croons "West of the Pecos".

Cast
 Carl Switzer as Alfalfa
 Benny Bartlett as Orvie 
 Rudy Wissler as Scat 
 Tommy Bond as Chimp
 Ray Dolciame as Corky  
 Vince Barnett as Steve 
 Emory Parnell as Police Sergeant Casey 
 Chili Williams as Nan Crowley 
 William Wright as Jim Kingsley 
 Lela Bliss as Mrs. Crowley 
 Ronn Marvin as Pulaski 
 Art Miles as Sheriff  
 Syd Saylor as Motorcycle Cop  
 Jay Silverheels as Kingsley's Henchman 
 Delmar Watson as Young Boy

References

Bibliography
 Marshall, Wendy L. William Beaudine: From Silents to Television. Scarecrow Press, 2005.

External links
 

1947 films
American comedy films
American black-and-white films
1947 comedy films
1940s English-language films
Films directed by William Beaudine
Producers Releasing Corporation films
American sequel films
1940s American films